The Henry Ford Health 200 is a  annual ARCA Menards Series race held at Michigan International Speedway in Brooklyn, Michigan. The inaugural event was held on July 20, 1980 and was won by Joe Ruttman. The series has raced at least once annually at the track since 1990.

History

ARCA ran its first race at Michigan International Speedway in 1980, when two races were held. The series would not return for nearly a decade, when it was added back to the calendar in 1990, where it has remained ever since. The race has been run between June and August since its inception, with every race falling in June each year since 1991. An additional second race was conducted at the speedway on seven occasions: 1980, 1991, 1996–1997, 2001, and 2005–2006.

Past winners

1991: Race shortened to 59 laps due to rain.

Multiple winners (drivers)

Multiple winners (teams)

Manufacturer wins

Former second race

The Hantz Group 200 was a  annual ARCA Menards Series race held at Michigan International Speedway in Brooklyn, Michigan. The inaugural event was held on September 20, 1980, and was won by Billie Harvey. The race has only been held on seven occasions, with the final running taking place in 2006.

Past winners

2005 & 2006: Race extended due to a green–white–checker finish.

Manufacturer wins

References

External links
 

ARCA Menards Series races
ARCA Menards Series
Motorsport in Michigan
NASCAR races at Michigan International Speedway
Annual sporting events in the United States